Chlordiazepoxide, trade name Librium among others, is a sedative and hypnotic medication of the benzodiazepine class; it is used to treat anxiety, insomnia and symptoms of withdrawal from alcohol and other drugs.

Chlordiazepoxide has a medium to long half-life but its active metabolite has a very long half-life. The drug has amnesic, anticonvulsant, anxiolytic, hypnotic, sedative and skeletal muscle relaxant properties.

Chlordiazepoxide was patented in 1958 and approved for medical use in 1960. It was the first benzodiazepine to be synthesized and the discovery of chlordiazepoxide was by pure chance. Chlordiazepoxide and other benzodiazepines were initially accepted with widespread public approval but were followed with widespread public disapproval and recommendations for more restrictive medical guidelines for its use.

Medical uses
Chlordiazepoxide is indicated for the short-term (2–4 weeks) treatment of anxiety that is severe and disabling or subjecting the person to unacceptable distress. It is also indicated as a treatment for the management of acute  alcohol withdrawal syndrome.

It can sometimes be prescribed to ease symptoms of irritable bowel syndrome combined with clidinium bromide as a fixed dose medication, Librax.

Contraindications
Use of chlordiazepoxide should be avoided in individuals with the following conditions:
 Myasthenia gravis
 Acute intoxication with alcohol, narcotics, or other psychoactive substances
 Ataxia
 Severe hypoventilation
 Acute narrow-angle glaucoma
 Severe liver deficiencies (hepatitis and liver cirrhosis decrease elimination by a factor of 2)
 Severe sleep apnea
 Hypersensitivity or allergy to any drug in the benzodiazepine class

Chlordiazepoxide is generally considered an inappropriate benzodiazepine for the elderly due to its long elimination half-life and the risks of accumulation. Benzodiazepines require special precaution if used in the elderly, pregnancy, children, alcohol- or drug-dependent individuals and individuals with comorbid psychiatric disorders.

Pregnancy
The research into the safety of benzodiazepines during pregnancy is limited and it is recommended that use of benzodiazepines during pregnancy should be based on whether the benefits outweigh the risks. If chlordiazepoxide is used during pregnancy the risks can be reduced via using the lowest effective dose and for the shortest time possible. Benzodiazepines should generally be avoided during the first trimester of pregnancy. Chlordiazepoxide and diazepam are considered to be among the safer benzodiazepines to use during pregnancy in comparison to other benzodiazepines. Possible adverse effects from benzodiazepine use during pregnancy include, abortion, malformation, intrauterine growth retardation, functional deficits, carcinogenesis and mutagenesis. Caution is also advised during breast feeding as chlordiazepoxide passes into breast milk.

Adverse effects
Sedative drugs and sleeping pills, including chlordiazepoxide, have been associated with an increased risk of death. The studies had many limitations: possibly tending to overestimate risk, such as possible confounding by indication with other risk factors; confusing hypnotics with drugs having other indications;

Common side-effects of chlordiazepoxide include:
 Confusion
 Constipation
 Drowsiness
 Fainting
 Altered sex drive
 Liver problems
 Lack of muscle coordination
 Minor menstrual irregularities
 Nausea
 Skin rash or eruptions
 Swelling due to fluid retention
 Yellow eyes and skin

Chlordiazepoxide in laboratory mice studies impairs latent learning.  Benzodiazepines impair learning and memory via their action on benzodiazepine receptors, which causes a dysfunction in the cholinergic neuronal system in mice. It was later found that impairment in learning was caused by an increase in benzodiazepine/GABA activity (and that benzodiazepines were not associated with the cholinergic system). In tests of various benzodiazepine compounds, chlordiazepoxide was found to cause the most profound reduction in the turnover of 5HT (serotonin) in rats. Serotonin is closely involved in regulating mood and may be one of the causes of feelings of depression in rats using chlordiazepoxide or other benzodiazepines.

In September 2020, the U.S. Food and Drug Administration (FDA) required the boxed warning be updated for all benzodiazepine medicines to describe the risks of abuse, misuse, addiction, physical dependence, and withdrawal reactions consistently across all the medicines in the class.

Tolerance and dependence

Tolerance
Chronic use of benzodiazepines, such as chlordiazepoxide, leads to the development of tolerance, with a decrease in number of benzodiazepine binding sites in mouse forebrain. The Committee of Review of Medicines, who carried out an extensive review of benzodiazepines including chlordiazepoxide, found—and were in agreement with the Institute of Medicine (USA) and the conclusions of a study carried out by the White House Office of Drug Policy and the National Institute on Drug Abuse (USA)—that there was little evidence that long-term use of benzodiazepines were beneficial in the treatment of insomnia due to the development of tolerance. Benzodiazepines tended to lose their sleep-promoting properties within 3–14 days of continuous use, and in the treatment of anxiety the committee found that there was little convincing evidence that benzodiazepines retained efficacy in the treatment of anxiety after 4 months' continuous use due to the development of tolerance.

Dependence
Chlordiazepoxide can cause physical dependence and what is known as the benzodiazepine withdrawal syndrome. Withdrawal from chlordiazepoxide or other benzodiazepines often leads to withdrawal symptoms that are similar to those seen with alcohol and barbiturates. The higher the dose and the longer the drug is taken, the greater the risk of experiencing unpleasant withdrawal symptoms. Withdrawal symptoms can, however, occur at standard dosages and also after short-term use. Benzodiazepine treatment should be discontinued as soon as possible through a slow and gradual dose-reduction regime.

Chlordiazepoxide taken during pregnancy can cause a postnatal benzodiazepine withdrawal syndrome.

Overdose

An individual who has consumed excess chlordiazepoxide may display some of the following symptoms:
 Somnolence (difficulty staying awake)
 Mental confusion
 Hypotension
 Hypoventilation
 Impaired motor functions
 Impaired reflexes
 Impaired coordination
 Impaired balance
 Dizziness
 Muscle weakness
 Coma

Chlordiazepoxide is a drug that is very frequently involved in drug intoxication, including overdose. Chlordiazepoxide overdose is considered a medical emergency and, in general, requires the immediate attention of medical personnel. The antidote for an overdose of chlordiazepoxide (or any other benzodiazepine) is flumazenil. Flumazenil should be given with caution as it may precipitate severe withdrawal symptoms in benzodiazepine-dependent individuals.

Pharmacology
Chlordiazepoxide acts on benzodiazepine allosteric sites that are part of the  GABAA receptor/ion-channel complex and this results in an increased binding of the inhibitory neurotransmitter GABA to the GABAA receptor thereby producing inhibitory effects on the central nervous system and body similar to the effects of other benzodiazepines. Chlordiazepoxide is anticonvulsant.
There is preferential storage of chlordiazepoxide in some organs including the heart of the neonate. Absorption by any administered route and the risk of accumulation is significantly increased in the neonate. The withdrawal of chlordiazepoxide during pregnancy and breast feeding is recommended, as chlordiazepoxide rapidly crosses the placenta and also is excreted in breast milk.  Chlordiazepoxide also decreases prolactin release in rats. Benzodiazepines act via micromolar benzodiazepine binding sites as Ca2+ channel blockers and significantly inhibit depolarization-sensitive Calcium uptake in animal nerve terminal preparations. Chlordiazepoxide inhibits acetylcholine release in mouse hippocampal synaptosomes in vivo. This has been found by measuring sodium-dependent high affinity choline uptake in vitro after pretreatment of the mice in vivo with chlordiazepoxide. This may play a role in chlordiazepoxide's anticonvulsant properties.

Pharmacokinetics
Chlordiazepoxide is a long-acting benzodiazepine drug. The half-life of Chlordiazepoxide is 5 – 30 hours but has an active benzodiazepine metabolite (desmethyldiazepam), which has a half-life of 36 – 200 hours. The half-life of chlordiazepoxide increases significantly in the elderly, which may result in prolonged action as well as accumulation of the drug during repeated administration. Delayed body clearance of the long half-life active metabolite also occurs in those over 60 years of age, which further prolongs the effects of the drugs with additional accumulation after repeated dosing.

Despite its name, chlordiazepoxide is not an epoxide; they are formed from different roots.

History
Chlordiazepoxide (initially called methaminodiazepoxide) was the first benzodiazepine to be synthesized in the mid-1950s. The synthesis was derived from work on a class of dyes, quinazolone-3-oxides. It was discovered by accident when in 1957 tests revealed that the compound had hypnotic, anxiolytic, and muscle relaxant effects. "The story of the chemical development of Librium and Valium was told by Sternbach. The serendipity involved in the invention of this class of compounds was matched by the trials and errors of the pharmacologists in the discovery of the tranquilizing activity of the benzodiazepines. The discovery of Librium in 1957 was due largely to the dedicated work and observational ability of a gifted technician, Beryl Kappell. For some seven years she had been screening compounds by simple animal tests for muscle relaxant activity..." Three years later chlordiazepoxide was marketed as a therapeutic benzodiazepine medication under the brand name Librium. Following chlordiazepoxide, in 1963 diazepam hit the market under the brand name Valium—and was followed by many further benzodiazepine compounds over the subsequent years and decades.

In 1959 it was used by over 2,000 physicians and more than 20,000 patients. It was described as "chemically and clinically different from any of the tranquilizers, psychic energizers or other psychotherapeutic drugs now available." During studies, chlordiazepoxide induced muscle relaxation and a quieting effect on laboratory animals like mice, rats, cats, and dogs. Fear and aggression were eliminated in much smaller doses than those necessary to produce hypnosis. Chlordiazepoxide is similar to phenobarbital in its anticonvulsant properties. However, it lacks the hypnotic effects of barbiturates. Animal tests were conducted in the Boston Zoo and the San Diego Zoo. Forty-two hospital patients admitted for acute and chronic alcoholism, and various psychoses and neuroses were treated with chlordiazepoxide. In a majority of the patients, anxiety, tension, and motor excitement were "effectively reduced." The most positive results were observed among alcoholic patients. It was reported that ulcers and dermatologic problems, both of which involved emotional factors, were reduced by chlordiazepoxide.

In 1963, approval for use was given to diazepam (Valium), a "simplified" version of chlordiazepoxide, primarily to counteract anxiety symptoms. Sleep-related problems were treated with nitrazepam (Mogadon), which was introduced in 1972, temazepam (Restoril), which was introduced in 1979, and flurazepam (Dalmane), which was introduced in 1975.

Recreational use

In 1963, Carl F. Essig of the Addiction Research Center of the National Institute of Mental Health stated that meprobamate, glutethimide, ethinamate, ethchlorvynol, methyprylon and chlordiazepoxide were drugs whose usefulness “can hardly be questioned.” However, Essig labeled these “newer products” as “drugs of addiction,” like barbiturates, whose habit-forming qualities were more widely known. He mentioned a 90-day study of chlordiazepoxide, which concluded that the automobile accident rate among 68 users was 10 times higher than normal. Participants' daily dosage ranged from 5 to 100 milligrams.

Chlordiazepoxide is a drug of potential misuse and is frequently detected in urine samples of drug users who have not been prescribed the drug.

Legal status
Internationally, chlordiazepoxide is a Schedule IV controlled drug under the Convention on Psychotropic Substances.

Toxicity

Animal
Laboratory tests assessing the toxicity of chlordiazepoxide, nitrazepam and diazepam on mice spermatozoa found that chlordiazepoxide produced toxicities in sperm including abnormalities involving both the shape and size of the sperm head. Nitrazepam, however, caused more profound abnormalities than chlordiazepoxide.

Availability
Chlordiazepoxide is available in various dosage forms, alone or in combination with other drugs, worldwide. In combination with Clidinium as NORMAXIN-CC and in combination with dicyclomine as NORMAXIN for IBS, and with the anti-depressant Amitriptyline as Limbitrol.

See also
 Alcohol withdrawal syndrome
 Effects of long-term benzodiazepine use
 Benzodiazepine withdrawal syndrome
 Benzodiazepine dependence
 Benzodiazepine

References

External links
 Rx-List.com - Chlordiazepoxide
 Inchem.org - Chlordiazepoxide
  U.S. National Library of Medicine: Drug Information Portal - Chlordiazepoxide

Amine oxides
Benzodiazepines
Chloroarenes
GABAA receptor positive allosteric modulators
Hoffmann-La Roche brands